Cola semecarpophylla is a species of flowering plant in the family Malvaceae. It is found in Cameroon and Nigeria. It is threatened by habitat loss.

References

semecarpophylla
Flora of Cameroon
Flora of Nigeria
Conservation dependent plants
Near threatened flora of Africa
Taxonomy articles created by Polbot